The Nelgesin Range is a mountain range in the Sakha Republic (Yakutia), Far Eastern Federal District, Russia. The nearest city is Batagay to the north of the range.

The nearest airport is Batagay Airport.

Geography
The Nelgesin Range rises in the area of the Yana-Oymyakon Highlands, part of the Chersky Mountains, to the west of the Adycha and north of the Derbeke.

The smaller Tirekhtyakh Range, another subrange of the Chersky Mountains, rises to the north, stretching parallel to the general direction of the Nelgesin Range.

See also
Derbeke-Nelgesinsky mine
List of mountains and hills of Russia

References

External links
Hiking in the area (in Russian)
State geological map of the Russian Federation, scale 1: 200,000. Map of minerals and patterns of their distribution.
Landscapes as a reflection of the toponyms of Yakutia
Ranges of Russia

Mountain ranges of the Sakha Republic
Chersky Range